Maílton dos Santos de Sá (born 31 May 1998), known simply as Maílton, is a Brazilian footballer who plays as a right-back for Metalist Kharkiv.

Career

Metalist Khatkiv
Maílton moved to Metalist Kharkiv on a permanent contract on 1 July 2022.

Chapecoense Loan
In summer 2022 he moved to Chapecoense, where he played 14 matches scoring one goal. In December 2022 he returned to Metalist Kharkiv.

Ponte Preta Loan
In December 2022, he moved on loan to Ponte Preta.

Honours
Atlético Mineiro
Campeonato Mineiro: 2020

References

External links
 

1998 births
Living people
Brazilian footballers
Association football defenders
Campeonato Brasileiro Série A players
Campeonato Brasileiro Série B players
Campeonato Brasileiro Série C players
Ukrainian First League players
Sociedade Esportiva Palmeiras players
Santa Cruz Futebol Clube players
Mirassol Futebol Clube players
Operário Ferroviário Esporte Clube players
Clube Atlético Mineiro players
Coritiba Foot Ball Club players
FC Metalist Kharkiv players
Brazilian expatriate footballers
Brazilian expatriate sportspeople in Ukraine
Expatriate footballers in Ukraine